Molluscicides – also known as snail baits, snail pellets, or slug pellets – are pesticides against molluscs, which are usually used in agriculture or gardening, in order to control gastropod pests specifically slugs and snails which damage crops or other valued plants by feeding on them.

A number of chemicals can be employed as a molluscicide:
 Metal salts such as iron(III) phosphate, aluminium sulfate, and ferric sodium EDTA, relatively non-toxic, also used in organic gardening
 Metaldehyde
 Niclosamide
 Acetylcholinesterase inhibitors (e.g. methiocarb), highly toxic to other animals and humans, acts also as a contact poison

Accidental poisonings 

Metal salt-based molluscicides are not toxic to higher animals. However, metaldehyde-based and especially acetylcholinesterase inhibitor-based products are highly toxic, and have resulted in many deaths of pets and humans. Some products contain a bittering agent that reduces but does not eliminate the risk of accidental poisoning. Anticholinergic drugs such as atropine can be used as an antidote for acetylcholinesterase inhibitor poisoning. There is no antidote for metaldehyde, the treatment is symptomatic.

See also 
 Pest control
 Biological pest control

References

External links 
 Overview of potential piscicides and molluscicides for controlling aquatic pest species in New Zealand 
 National Pesticide Information Center (NPIC) Information about pesticide-related topics.
 Get Rid of Slugs and Snails, Not Puppy Tails! Case Profile - National Pesticide Information Center
 Slugs and Snails - National Pesticide Information Center
 Snail bait and dogs
 Snail Bait Poisoning
 in the Garden Safety in the Garden
 Metaldehyde toxicity
 Iron phosphate: The first honestly effective snail & slug bait